Kot Radha Kishan railway station (Urdu and ) is located in Kot Radha Kishan city, Kasur district of Punjab province of the Pakistan.

See also
 List of railway stations in Pakistan
 Pakistan Railways

References

External links

Railway stations in Kasur District
Railway stations on Karachi–Peshawar Line (ML 1)